Eli Waters is a coastal suburb of Hervey Bay in the Fraser Coast Region, Queensland, Australia.

Geography 
The suburb is bounded to the north by the bay. The land in the northern part of the suburb is undeveloped wetlands with the suburban development in the south of the locality. Some of the west of the locality is used for grazing.

Eli Creek (from which the suburb presumably takes its name) flows through the locality from Uraween to the south through to the bay in the north of the locality. A number of artificial lakes have been constructed within the suburban area.

History 
Xavier Catholic College opened on 29 January 2003 with 90 Year 8 students. The school was named in honour of St Francis Xavier. In  In 2007, it expanded to offer primary schooling with an initial intake of students into Prep to Year 3.

Education 
Xavier Catholic College is a Catholic primary and secondary (Prep-12) school for boys and girls at 1 Wide Bay Drive. In 2017, the school had an enrolment of 1,065 students with 82 teachers (75 full-time equivalent) and 49 non-teaching staff (33 full-time equivalent).

The nearest public primary schools are in neighbouring Pialba and Uraween. The nearest public secondary school is in Pialba.

References

External links
 

Suburbs of Hervey Bay
Coastline of Queensland